Mania, also known as manic syndrome, is a mental and behavioral disorder defined as a state of abnormally elevated arousal, affect, and energy level, or "a state of heightened overall activation with enhanced affective expression together with lability of affect." During a manic episode, an individual will experience rapidly changing emotions and moods, highly influenced by surrounding stimuli. Although mania is often conceived as a "mirror image" to depression, the heightened mood can be either euphoric or dysphoric. As the mania intensifies, irritability can be more pronounced and result in anxiety or anger.

The symptoms of mania include elevated mood (either euphoric or irritable), flight of ideas and pressure of speech, increased energy, decreased need and desire for sleep, and hyperactivity. They are most plainly evident in fully developed hypomanic states. However, in full-blown mania, these symptoms become progressively exacerbated. In severe manic episodes, these symptoms may be obscured by other signs and symptoms characteristic of psychosis, such as delusions, hallucinations, fragmentation of behavior, and catatonia.

Causes and diagnosis
Mania is a syndrome with multiple causes. Although the vast majority of cases occur in the context of bipolar disorder, it is a key component of other psychiatric disorders (such as schizoaffective disorder, bipolar type) and may also occur secondary to various general medical conditions, such as multiple sclerosis; certain medications may perpetuate a manic state, for example prednisone; or substances prone to abuse, especially stimulants, such as caffeine and cocaine. In the current DSM-5, hypomanic episodes are separated from the more severe full manic episodes, which, in turn, are characterized as either mild, moderate, or severe, with certain diagnostic criteria (e.g. catatonia, psychosis). Mania is divided into three stages: hypomania, or stage I; acute mania, or stage II; and delirious mania (delirium), or stage III. This "staging" of a manic episode is useful from a descriptive and differential diagnostic point of view 

Mania varies in intensity, from mild mania (hypomania) to delirious mania, marked by such symptoms as disorientation, florid psychosis, incoherence, and catatonia. Standardized tools such as Altman Self-Rating Mania Scale and Young Mania Rating Scale can be used to measure severity of manic episodes. Because mania and hypomania have also long been associated with creativity and artistic talent, it is not always the case that the clearly manic/hypomanic bipolar patient needs or wants medical help; such persons often either retain sufficient self-control to function normally or are unaware that they have "gone manic" severely enough to be committed or to commit themselves. Manic persons often can be mistaken for being under the influence of drugs.

Classification

Mixed states 

In a mixed affective state, the individual, though meeting the general criteria for a hypomanic (discussed below) or manic episode, experiences three or more concurrent depressive symptoms. This has caused some speculation, among clinicians, that mania and depression, rather than constituting "true" polar opposites, are, rather, two independent axes in a unipolar—bipolar spectrum.

A mixed affective state, especially with prominent manic symptoms, places the patient at a greater risk for suicide. Depression on its own is a risk factor but, when coupled with an increase in energy and goal-directed activity, the patient is far more likely to act with violence on suicidal impulses.

Hypomania 

Hypomania, which means "less than mania", is a lowered state of mania that does little to impair function or decrease quality of life. Although creativity and hypomania have been historically linked, a review and meta-analysis exploring this relationship found that this assumption may be too general and empirical research evidence is lacking. In hypomania, there is less need for sleep and both goal-motivated behaviour and metabolism increase. Some studies exploring brain metabolism in subjects with hypomania, however, did not find any conclusive link; while there are studies that reported abnormalities, some failed to detect differences. Though the elevated mood and energy level typical of hypomania could be seen as a benefit, true mania itself generally has many undesirable consequences including suicidal tendencies, and hypomania can, if the prominent mood is irritable as opposed to euphoric, be a rather unpleasant experience. In addition, the exaggerated case of hypomania can lead to problems. For instance, trait-based positivity for a person could make them more engaging and outgoing, and cause them to have a positive outlook in life. When exaggerated in hypomania, however, such a person can display excessive optimism, grandiosity, and poor decision making, often with little regard to the consequences.

Associated disorders 
A single manic episode, in the absence of secondary causes, (i.e., substance use disorders, pharmacologics, or general medical conditions) is often sufficient to diagnose bipolar I disorder. Hypomania may be indicative of bipolar II disorder. Manic episodes are often complicated by delusions and/or hallucinations; and if the psychotic features persist for a duration significantly longer than the episode of typical mania (two weeks or more), a diagnosis of schizoaffective disorder is more appropriate. Certain obsessive-compulsive spectrum disorders as well as impulse control disorders share the suffix "-mania," namely, kleptomania, pyromania, and trichotillomania. Despite the unfortunate association implied by the name, however, no connection exists between mania or bipolar disorder and these disorders.
Furthermore, evidence indicates a B12 deficiency can also cause symptoms characteristic of mania and psychosis.

Hyperthyroidism can produce similar symptoms to those of mania, such as agitation, elevated mood, increased energy, hyperactivity, sleep disturbances and sometimes, especially in severe cases, psychosis.

Signs and symptoms 
A manic episode is defined in the American Psychiatric Association's diagnostic manual as a "distinct period of abnormally and persistently elevated, expansive, or irritable mood and abnormally and persistently increased activity or energy, lasting at least 1 week and present most of the day, nearly every day (or any duration, if hospitalization is necessary)," where the mood is not caused by drugs/medication or a non-mental medical illness (e.g., hyperthyroidism), and: (a) is causing obvious difficulties at work or in social relationships and activities, or (b) requires admission to hospital to protect the person or others, or (c) the person has psychosis.

To be classified as a manic episode, while the disturbed mood and an increase in goal-directed activity or energy is present, at least three (or four, if only irritability is present) of the following must have been consistently present:
 
 Inflated self-esteem or grandiosity. 
 Decreased need for sleep (e.g., feels rested after 3 hours of sleep). 
 More talkative than usual, or acts pressured to keep talking.
 Flights of ideas or subjective experience that thoughts are racing. 
 Increase in goal-directed activity, or psychomotor acceleration. 
 Distractibility (too easily drawn to unimportant or irrelevant external stimuli). 
 Excessive involvement in activities with a high likelihood of painful consequences. (e.g., extravagant shopping, improbable commercial schemes, hypersexuality).

Though the activities one participates in while in a manic state are not always negative, those with the potential to have negative outcomes are far more likely.

If the person is concurrently depressed, they are said to be having a mixed episode.

The World Health Organization's classification system defines a manic episode as one where mood is higher than the person's situation warrants and may vary from relaxed high spirits to barely controllable exuberance, is accompanied by hyperactivity, a compulsion to speak, a reduced sleep requirement, difficulty sustaining attention, and/or often increased distractibility. Frequently, confidence and self-esteem are excessively enlarged, and grand, extravagant ideas are expressed. Behavior that is out-of-character and risky, foolish or inappropriate may result from a loss of normal social restraint.

Some people also have physical symptoms, such as sweating, pacing, and weight loss. In full-blown mania, often the manic person will feel as though their goal(s) are of paramount importance, that there are no consequences, or that negative consequences would be minimal, and that they need not exercise restraint in the pursuit of what they are after. Hypomania is different, as it may cause little or no impairment in function. The hypomanic person's connection with the external world, and its standards of interaction, remain intact, although intensity of moods is heightened. But those with prolonged unresolved hypomania do run the risk of developing full mania, and may cross that "line" without even realizing they have done so.

One of the signature symptoms of mania (and to a lesser extent, hypomania) is what many have described as racing thoughts. These are usually instances in which the manic person is excessively distracted by objectively unimportant stimuli. This experience creates an absent-mindedness where the manic individual's thoughts totally preoccupy them, making them unable to keep track of time, or be aware of anything besides the flow of thoughts. Racing thoughts also interfere with the ability to fall asleep.

Manic states are always relative to the normal state of intensity of the affected individual; thus, already irritable patients may find themselves losing their tempers even more quickly, and an academically gifted person may, during the hypomanic stage, adopt seemingly "genius" characteristics and an ability to perform and articulate at a level far beyond that which they would be capable of during euthymia. A very simple indicator of a manic state would be if a heretofore clinically depressed patient suddenly becomes inordinately energetic, enthusiastic, cheerful, aggressive, or "over-happy". Other, often less obvious, elements of mania include delusions (generally of either grandeur or persecution, according to whether the predominant mood is euphoric or irritable), hypersensitivity, hypervigilance, hypersexuality, hyper-religiosity, hyperactivity and impulsivity, a compulsion to over explain (typically accompanied by pressure of speech), grandiose schemes and ideas, and a decreased need for sleep (for example, feeling rested after only 3 or 4 hours of sleep). In the case of the latter, the eyes of such patients may both look and seem abnormally "wide open", rarely blinking, and may contribute to some clinicians' erroneous belief that these patients are under the influence of a stimulant drug, when the patient, in fact, is either not on any mind-altering substances or is actually on a depressant drug. Individuals may also engage in out-of-character behavior during the episode, such as questionable business transactions, wasteful expenditures of money (e.g., spending sprees), risky sexual activity, abuse of recreational substances, excessive gambling, reckless behavior (such as extreme speeding or other daredevil activity), abnormal social interaction (e.g. over-familiarity and conversing with strangers), or highly vocal arguments. These behaviours may increase stress in personal relationships, lead to problems at work, and increase the risk of altercations with law enforcement. There is a high risk of impulsively taking part in activities potentially harmful to the self and others.

Although "severely elevated mood" sounds somewhat desirable and enjoyable, the experience of mania is ultimately often quite unpleasant and sometimes disturbing, if not frightening, for the person involved and for those close to them, and it may lead to impulsive behaviour that may later be regretted. It can also often be complicated by the individual's lack of judgment and insight regarding periods of exacerbation of characteristic states. Manic patients are frequently grandiose, obsessive, impulsive, irritable, belligerent, and frequently deny anything is wrong with them. Because mania frequently encourages high energy and decreased perception of need or ability to sleep, within a few days of a manic cycle, sleep-deprived psychosis may appear, further complicating the ability to think clearly. Racing thoughts and misperceptions lead to frustration and decreased ability to communicate with others.

Mania may also, as earlier mentioned, be divided into three “stages”. Stage I corresponds with hypomania and may feature typical hypomanic characteristics, such as gregariousness and euphoria. In stages II and III mania, however, the patient may be extraordinarily irritable, psychotic or even delirious. These latter two stages are referred to as acute and delirious (or Bell's), respectively.

Causes
Various triggers have been associated with switching from euthymic or depressed states into mania. One common trigger of mania is antidepressant therapy. Studies show that the risk of switching while on an antidepressant is between 6-69 percent. Dopaminergic drugs such as reuptake inhibitors and dopamine agonists may also increase risk of switch. Other medications possibly include glutaminergic agents and drugs that alter the HPA axis. Lifestyle triggers include irregular sleep-wake schedules and sleep deprivation, as well as extremely emotional or stressful stimuli.

Various genes that have been implicated in genetic studies of bipolar have been manipulated in preclinical animal models to produce syndromes reflecting different aspects of mania. CLOCK and DBP polymorphisms have been linked to bipolar in population studies, and behavioral changes induced by knockout are reversed by lithium treatment. Metabotropic glutamate receptor 6 has been genetically linked to bipolar, and found to be under-expressed in the cortex. Pituitary adenylate cyclase-activating peptide has been associated with bipolar in gene linkage studies, and knockout in mice produces mania like-behavior. Targets of various treatments such as GSK-3, and ERK1 have also demonstrated mania like behavior in preclinical models.

Mania may be associated with strokes, especially cerebral lesions in the right hemisphere.

Deep brain stimulation of the subthalamic nucleus in Parkinson's disease has been associated with mania, especially with electrodes placed in the ventromedial STN. A proposed mechanism involves increased excitatory input from the STN to dopaminergic nuclei.

There are certain psychoactive substances that can induce a state of manic psychosis, including: amphetamine, cathinone, cocaine, MDMA, methamphetamine, methylphenidate, oxycodone, phencyclidine, designer drugs, etc.

Mania can also be caused by physical trauma or illness. When the causes are physical, it is called secondary mania.

Mechanism 

The mechanism underlying mania is unknown, but the neurocognitive profile of mania is highly consistent with dysfunction in the right prefrontal cortex, a common finding in neuroimaging studies. Various lines of evidence from post-mortem studies and the putative mechanisms of anti-manic agents point to abnormalities in GSK-3, dopamine, Protein kinase C and Inositol monophosphatase.

Meta analysis of neuroimaging studies demonstrate increased thalamic activity, and bilaterally reduced inferior frontal gyrus activation. Activity in the amygdala and other subcortical structures such as the ventral striatum tend to be increased, although results are inconsistent and likely dependent upon task characteristics such as valence. Reduced functional connectivity between the ventral prefrontal cortex and amygdala along with variable findings supports a hypothesis of general dysregulation of subcortical structures by the prefrontal cortex. A bias towards positively valenced stimuli, and increased responsiveness in reward circuitry may predispose towards mania. Mania tends to be associated with right hemisphere lesions, while depression tends to be associated with left hemisphere lesions.

Post-mortem examinations of bipolar disorder demonstrate increased expression of Protein Kinase C (PKC). While limited, some studies demonstrate manipulation of PKC in animals produces behavioral changes mirroring mania, and treatment with PKC inhibitor tamoxifen (also an anti-estrogen drug) demonstrates antimanic effects. Traditional antimanic drugs also demonstrate PKC inhibiting properties, among other effects such as GSK3 inhibition.

Manic episodes may be triggered by dopamine receptor agonists, and this combined with tentative reports of increased VMAT2 activity, measured via PET scans of radioligand binding, suggests
a role of dopamine in mania. Decreased cerebrospinal fluid levels of the serotonin metabolite 5-HIAA have been found in manic patients too, which may be explained by a failure of serotonergic regulation and dopaminergic hyperactivity.

Limited evidence suggests that mania is associated with behavioral reward hypersensitivity, as well as with neural reward hypersensitivity. Electrophysiological evidence supporting this comes from studies associating left frontal EEG activity with mania. As left frontal EEG activity is generally thought to be a reflection of behavioral activation system activity, this is thought to support a role for reward hypersensitivity in mania. Tentative evidence also comes from one study that reported an association between manic traits and feedback negativity during receipt of monetary reward or loss. Neuroimaging evidence during acute mania is sparse, but one study reported elevated orbitofrontal cortex activity to monetary reward, and another study reported elevated striatal activity to reward omission. The latter finding was interpreted in the context of either elevated baseline activity (resulting in a null finding of reward hypersensitivity), or reduced ability to discriminate between reward and punishment, still supporting reward hyperactivity in mania. Punishment hyposensitivity, as reflected in a number of neuroimaging studies as reduced lateral orbitofrontal response to punishment, has been proposed as a mechanism of reward hypersensitivity in mania.

Diagnosis

In the ICD-10 there are several disorders with the manic syndrome: organic manic disorder, mania without psychotic symptoms, mania with psychotic symptoms, other manic episodes, unspecified manic episode, manic type of schizoaffective disorder, bipolar disorder, current episode manic without psychotic symptoms, bipolar affective disorder, current episode manic with psychotic symptoms.

Treatment 
Before beginning treatment for mania, careful differential diagnosis must be performed to rule out secondary causes.

The acute treatment of a manic episode of bipolar disorder involves the utilization of either a mood stabilizer (carbamazepine, valproate, lithium, or lamotrigine) or an atypical antipsychotic (olanzapine, quetiapine, risperidone, aripiprazole, or cariprazine). The use of antipsychotic agents in the treatment of acute mania was reviewed by Tohen and Vieta in 2009.

When the manic behaviours have gone, long-term treatment then focuses on prophylactic treatment to try to stabilize the patient's mood, typically through a combination of pharmacotherapy and psychotherapy. The likelihood of having a relapse is very high for those who have experienced two or more episodes of mania or depression. While medication for bipolar disorder is important to manage symptoms of mania and depression, studies show relying on medications alone is not the most effective method of treatment. Medication is most effective when used in combination with other bipolar disorder treatments, including psychotherapy, self-help coping strategies, and healthy lifestyle choices.

Lithium is the classic mood stabilizer to prevent further manic and depressive episodes. A systematic review found that long term lithium treatment substantially reduces the risk of bipolar manic relapse, by 42%. Anticonvulsants such as valproate, oxcarbazepine and carbamazepine are also used for prophylaxis. More recent drug solutions include lamotrigine and topiramate, both anticonvulsants as well.

In some cases, long-acting benzodiazepines, particularly clonazepam, are used after other options are exhausted. In more urgent circumstances, such as in emergency rooms, lorazepam, combined with haloperidol, is used to promptly alleviate symptoms of agitation, aggression, and psychosis.

Antidepressant monotherapy is not recommended for the treatment of depression in patients with bipolar disorders I or II, and no benefit has been demonstrated by combining antidepressants with mood stabilizers in these patients. Some atypical antidepressants, however, such as mirtazepine and trazodone have been occasionally used after other options have failed.

Society and culture 

In Electroboy: A Memoir of Mania by Andy Behrman, he describes his experience of mania as "the most perfect prescription glasses with which to see the world... life appears in front of you like an oversized movie screen".  Behrman indicates early in his memoir that he sees himself not as a person with an uncontrollable disabling illness, but as a director of the movie that is his vivid and emotionally alive life. There is some evidence that people in the creative industries have bipolar disorder more often than those in other occupations.
Winston Churchill had periods of manic symptoms that may have been both an asset and a liability.

English actor Stephen Fry, who has bipolar disorder, recounts manic behaviour during his adolescence: "When I was about 17 ... going around London on two stolen credit cards, it was a sort of fantastic reinvention of myself, an attempt to. I bought ridiculous suits with stiff collars and silk ties from the 1920s, and would go to the Savoy and Ritz and drink cocktails." While he has experienced suicidal thoughts, he says the manic side of his condition has had positive contributions on his life.

Etymology
The nosology of the various stages of a manic episode has changed over the decades. The word derives from the Ancient Greek μανία (manía), "madness, frenzy" and the verb μαίνομαι (maínomai), "to be mad, to rage, to be furious".

See also 

 Abnormal psychology
 Adult attention deficit hyperactivity disorder
 Bipolar disorder
 Cyclothymia
 Hyperthymia
 Hypomania
 People with bipolar disorder
 International Society for Bipolar Disorders
 Major depressive disorder
 Young Mania Rating Scale
 Dancing mania

References

Further reading 
 Expert Opin Pharmacother. 2001 December;2(12):1963–73.
 Schizoaffective Disorder. 2007 September Mayo Clinic. Retrieved October 1, 2007.
 Schizoaffective Disorder . 2004 May. All Psych Online: Virtual Psychology Classroom. Retrieved October 2, 2007.
 Psychotic Disorders. 2004 May. All Psych Online: Virtual Psychology Classroom. Retrieved October 2, 2007.

External links 

 Bipolar Mania Symptoms
 Depression and Bipolar Support Alliance

 
Bipolar disorder
Mood disorders